On Klang is a tambon (subdistrict) of Mae On District, in Chiang Mai Province, Thailand. In 2018 it had a total population of 4,875 people.

Administration

Central administration
The tambon is subdivided into 11 administrative villages (muban).

Local administration
The whole area of the subdistrict is covered by the subdistrict administrative organization (SAO) On Klang (องค์การบริหารส่วนตำบลออนกลาง).

References

External links
Thaitambon.com on On Klang

Tambon of Chiang Mai province
Populated places in Chiang Mai province